Gareth Southgate  (born 3 September 1970) is an English professional football manager and former player who played as a defender and midfielder. He has been the manager of the England national team since 2016.

Southgate won the League Cup with both Aston Villa (in 1995–96) and Middlesbrough (in 2003–04) and captained Crystal Palace to win the First Division championship in 1993–94. He also played in the 2000 FA Cup Final for Villa and the 2006 UEFA Cup Final for Middlesbrough. Internationally, Southgate made 57 appearances for the England team between 1995 and 2004. He played every game of England's campaign in the UEFA Euro 1996, but his penalty miss sent England out in the semi-final. He also featured in both the 1998 FIFA World Cup and the UEFA Euro 2000. His playing career ended in May 2006 at the age of 35, after more than 500 league appearances.

Southgate was manager of Middlesbrough from June 2006 until October 2009. He also managed the England under-21 team from 2013 to 2016, before becoming the England national team manager in 2016, succeeding Sam Allardyce. In his first tournament as England manager, the 2018 FIFA World Cup, Southgate became the third manager (after Alf Ramsey and Bobby Robson) to reach a World Cup semi-final with the England team, which won him the BBC Sports Personality of the Year Coach Award. At UEFA Euro 2020, he became the first England manager to reach the final of a European Championship and to reach any major tournament final since 1966; England eventually lost to Italy in a penalty shootout.

Early life and education
Gareth Southgate was born on 3 September 1970 in Watford, Hertfordshire. He attended Padnell Infant School in Cowplain, Hampshire, along with Pound Hill Junior School and Hazelwick School in Crawley, West Sussex. As a schoolboy he supported Manchester United and his football hero was Bryan Robson. He left school with eight O-Levels at grades between A and C. He studied at Croydon College between 1987 and 1989, successfully completing a City & Guilds Certificate in Recreation and Leisure Industries as part of The Footballers Further Education & Vocational Training Society Youth Training Scheme.

Club career

Southampton
Southgate played as a youth for two-and-a-half years for Southampton before being released as a thirteen-year-old.

Crystal Palace
Southgate began his career at Crystal Palace, playing initially at right-back and then in central midfield. He became captain and led the club to the 1993–94 First Division title. After the South London club's relegation from the Premier League, he moved to Aston Villa for a fee of £2.5 million, having made 152 appearances over four seasons.

His nickname at Palace was "Nord", given to him because his precise way of speaking reminded one of the coaches of Denis Norden's vocal delivery.

Aston Villa
At Aston Villa, he was converted into a centre-back and was part of a formidable defence. In his first season, he lifted the League Cup and Aston Villa qualified for the UEFA Cup. Southgate played in every Premier League game during the 1998–99 season. He continued to play for Villa in the 1999–2000 season as Villa reached the FA Cup Final, but handed in a transfer request just before Euro 2000, claiming that "if I am to achieve in my career, it is time to move on."

Middlesbrough
On 11 July 2001, Southgate signed for Middlesbrough for a £6.5 million fee. He joined on a four-year deal and was the first signing by Steve McClaren, whom he knew as an England coach.

In July 2002, after Paul Ince left for Wolverhampton Wanderers, Southgate was appointed the new Middlesbrough captain. On 29 February 2004, he became the first Boro skipper in their 128-year history to lift a trophy, as they defeated Bolton Wanderers in the League Cup final at the Millennium Stadium.

Southgate rejected media rumours that he was set to move to Manchester United following Rio Ferdinand's ban for missing a drug test in January 2004. He later committed his final playing years to Middlesbrough, signing until 2007. His final appearance as a professional player was in the 2006 UEFA Cup Final against Sevilla, which Boro lost 4–0 at the Philips Stadion in Eindhoven.

International career
Southgate made his debut for England as a substitute against Portugal in December 1995 under the management of Terry Venables. Southgate played every minute of their matches as hosts England reached the semi-final of UEFA Euro 1996, in which they faced Germany. The match was determined in a penalty shoot-out; Southgate's penalty was saved, and England were eliminated when Andreas Möller scored the next German penalty. Southgate managed to make light of his blunder later that year by appearing in an advert for Pizza Hut, also featuring Stuart Pearce and Chris Waddle, who had missed crucial penalties at the 1990 FIFA World Cup.

Southgate also played in the 1998 FIFA World Cup and UEFA Euro 2000. His 50th cap came in a 1–1 draw with Portugal at Villa Park in September 2002. On 11 June 2003, he played the full 90 minutes in a 2–1 Euro 2004 qualifying win over Slovakia at his club ground of the Riverside Stadium, competing against Middlesbrough's striker Szilárd Németh.

Southgate was capped 57 times for England and scored twice. His first goal came on 14 October 1998 against Luxembourg in a Euro 2000 qualifier, his second on 22 May 2003 against South Africa in a friendly. He is Aston Villa's most capped England player, having played 42 of his 57 internationals whilst with Villa.

Managerial career

Middlesbrough

2006–07 season
Middlesbrough manager Steve McClaren left the club in June 2006 to replace Sven-Göran Eriksson as the manager of the England national team. Although Martin O'Neill was initially the favourite for the new vacancy, Southgate was chosen by chairman Steve Gibson to succeed McClaren, committing to a five-year contract. As Southgate did not have the required coaching qualifications (the UEFA Pro Licence) to manage a top-flight club, he could only be appointed initially for twelve weeks, but he was allowed to stay on as manager after receiving a special dispensation from the Premier League board in November 2006. Middlesbrough successfully argued that, because Southgate had recently been an international player, he had had no opportunity to undertake the coaching courses. Southgate subsequently went on to complete his coaching qualifications.

Upon his appointment, Southgate was tasked with rebuilding a side that had sold several players at the end of the previous league campaign, including key players such as Jimmy Floyd Hasselbaink and Doriva. His first signing as a manager came on 12 July, when Herold Goulon signed from Lyon for an undisclosed fee. He brought in four defensive additions to the squad, with Julio Arca arriving from local rivals Sunderland, Robert Huth from Chelsea and Jason Euell from Charlton Athletic on permanent deals, whereas Jonathan Woodgate joined on a season-long loan from Real Madrid. After playing eleven games in their pre-season campaign, Southgate's managerial reign kicked off on 19 August 2006, the first day of the Premier League season, where his side lost 3–2 away at Reading. Despite a disappointing start, they redeemed themselves when hosting reigning champions Chelsea at the Riverside Stadium, the game ending in a 2–1 victory.

During Southgate's first season in charge, the side secured some promising victories, but lost away from home to all three newly promoted sides. Furthermore, it took until January for the team to register their first away win of the season, a 3–1 victory at an out-of-form Charlton Athletic, their first away success since April of the previous year. Their highest-scoring victory of the season was a 5–1 win over Bolton Wanderers. Southgate's side finished the Premier League season sat in twelfth position. That season also saw the club eliminated from the League Cup at the earliest possibility, suffering a 1–0 defeat to Notts County in the first round. In the FA Cup, the club had a replay in every round they participated in. They were eventually eliminated by Manchester United in the sixth round of the competition, suffering a 3–2 aggregate loss. Due to every possible match going to a replay, Middlesbrough actually played more competition matches than the previous season's champions Liverpool.

2007–08 season
Middlesbrough were very active during both transfer windows, with Jonathan Woodgate being the first signing during the summer, arriving from Real Madrid for a £7 million transfer fee; Woodgate had previously played for the club during the previous league campaign on loan. The club went on to break their personal transfer record, for the first time since 2002, when Afonso Alves arrived from Heerenveen for €20 million.

In December 2007, Arsenal manager Arsène Wenger suggested Southgate as one of several English managers who were "all good enough" to manage the national team. Southgate had faced some criticism earlier on that season, after his side suffered a spell in the relegation zone, but Middlesbrough managed to pull clear of the bottom three. Southgate would go on to guide his side to a thirteenth-place finish in the Premier League; their final game of the league campaign saw them secure an 8–1 victory against Manchester City at home, the club's biggest victory in the Premier League era, and Southgate's largest margin of victory in management.

2008–09 season: Relegation and dismissal
The pre-season build-up ahead of the 2008–09 season was disappointing for the club. Due to heavy spending during the previous season, the club's net spending was almost nil. Furthermore, club legend Mark Schwarzer left the club after eleven years, joining Premier League rivals Fulham on the expiration of his contract. Furthermore, key players such as George Boateng and Lee Cattermole also left the club, once again leaving Southgate with a rebuilding challenge to change Middlesbrough's fortunes. Despite the negative events during pre-season, Middlesbrough secured two victories out of a possible three, resulting in Southgate being named the Premier League Manager of the Month for August. This made Southgate the second person, after Stuart Pearce, to achieve both the Player and Manager of the Month awards, and he became the first Middlesbrough manager to win the award since Terry Venables in January 2001.

In November 2008, Southgate took Middlesbrough up to eighth place in the league, following an away win against an in-form Aston Villa, another former playing club of Southgate's; however, Middlesbrough then went fourteen games without a win, until they beat Liverpool at home 2–0 on 28 February 2009. After an away defeat against Stoke City, some of the travelling supporters were calling for his dismissal, having only achieved a single win in eighteen games and survival from relegation looking highly unlikely. On 24 March, chairman Steve Gibson spoke out on the manager's future, stating that sacking Southgate "would not help the situation".

Due to results elsewhere, Middlesbrough's status as a Premier League club went down to the final day: they needed relegation rivals Newcastle United and Hull City to lose, with them needing a five-goal swing to the latter in goal difference. Middlesbrough faced West Ham United away from home; the game ended in a 2–1 defeat, confirming Middlesbrough's relegation to the Championship after eleven consecutive seasons in the top-flight, as a 19th-place finish was confirmed. Following their relegation, Southgate expressed his determination to achieve instant promotion back up to the Premier League, praising the supporters and showing his sorrow for them in the process.

Middlesbrough's Championship campaign started strongly, putting them in contention for an immediate return to the Premier League. However, on 20 October 2009, shortly after a 2–0 victory over Derby County and with the club in fourth place, Southgate was dismissed as manager. His dismissal was controversial as he had taken Middlesbrough to within one point of the top position, though chairman Gibson stated that he had made the decision weeks previously in the best interests of the club. He was replaced by Gordon Strachan, who was unable to take the club back to the Premier League. Middlesbrough would have to wait until 2016 to achieve promotion to the Premier League, under the management of Aitor Karanka.

England

2013–2016: Tenure with the under-21s

After four years out of football, Southgate returned to management after he signed a three-year contract to succeed Stuart Pearce as the manager of the England under-21 team on 22 August 2013. Senior team manager Roy Hodgson had taken charge for the team's 6–0 victory over Scotland in the interim period prior to Southgate's appointment. His first game in charge saw the Young Lions defeat Moldova 1–0 in a UEFA European Championship qualification match, thanks to a goal from striker Saido Berahino.

Southgate would go on to lead his team to qualify for the finals of the 2015 European Championship; their good fortune could not continue however, as they finished bottom of their narrow-pointed group, therefore being knocked out of the competition. Their only victory during the competition came when Jesse Lingard scored the singular goal in their 1–0 success over Sweden, who would go on to qualify for the competition's knockout phase.

In June 2016, Southgate said that he did not want to fill the England senior team position left vacant by Hodgson.

2016–2017: Promotion to senior team role
Southgate was put in temporary charge of the senior England team on 27 September 2016, when Sam Allardyce resigned after one game due to the 2016 English football scandal. England were in the early stages of qualifying for the 2018 FIFA World Cup. After winning his first game in charge 2–0 against Malta, under Southgate's leadership, England went on to draw 0–0 with Slovenia, beat Scotland 3–0, and in his last game in temporary charge, drew 2–2 with Spain, despite leading 2–0 and conceding goals in the 89th and 96th minutes. Southgate's spell as caretaker manager ended on 15 November, with him appointed on a permanent basis when he penned a four-year contract two weeks later.

2018 World Cup

The England team qualified for the 2018 FIFA World Cup on 5 October 2017 after a 1–0 home win over Slovenia. The Football Association confirmed in December that Southgate would remain as England manager even if the team did not progress beyond the group stage of the tournament, describing their expectations as "realistic" and the tournament as "a really important staging post for our development".

After wins against Tunisia and Panama saw England qualify behind Belgium in their group, Southgate's England beat Colombia 4–3 on penalties in the round of 16 after a 1–1 draw on 3 July 2018 to claim his nation's first ever World Cup penalty shoot-out victory and a place in the quarter-finals. England then defeated Sweden 2–0 in the quarter-finals on 7 July, with Southgate becoming the first England manager to reach the semi-finals of a World Cup since Bobby Robson in 1990. This success bought Southgate significant admiration from England fans. For the semi-final with Croatia, fans dressed up in waistcoats in tribute to Southgate's iconic waistcoat, which he wore during England's matches: retailer Marks & Spencer reported a 35% increase in sales of waistcoats, and the hashtag 'WaistcoatWednesday' trended on Twitter.

On 11 July 2018, Southgate's England side suffered a 2–1 defeat to Croatia during extra time in the semi-finals. Kieran Trippier opened the scoring for England with a free kick, before a goal from Ivan Perišić sent the tie into extra time. Mario Mandžukić scored the winner for Croatia in the second half of extra time. With England trailing, the match also saw England play the final ten minutes of extra time with ten men as Trippier suffered an injury after Southgate had already made his permitted substitutions. Following a 2–0 defeat to Belgium in the third place play-off, England ended the World Cup in fourth place. Harry Kane, a striker and the England team captain, won the Golden Boot as the tournament's top goal-scorer.

A week after the end of the tournament, Southgate tube station in Enfield, London, was renamed "Gareth Southgate" for two days in recognition of Southgate's achievement. Southgate was also lauded for personal qualities shown in the World Cup, including consoling Colombia's Mateus Uribe, whose missed penalty had seen England win.

2018–19 UEFA Nations League
In 2019, Southgate managed England to third place in the inaugural UEFA Nations League. They did so after finishing top of a group containing Spain and Croatia. Their 3–2 victory away against the Spanish was their first victory in Spain for 31 years. They lost 3–1 to the Netherlands in the semi-final but then beat Switzerland 6–5 in a penalty shootout after the third-place match finished goalless. It was England's first third-place finish in a major international tournament since UEFA Euro 1968.

UEFA Euro 2020
At UEFA Euro 2020, England finished top of Group D which included Croatia, Scotland and the Czech Republic, beating Croatia 1–0 to start the European Championship with a win for England for the first time, drawing Scotland 0–0, and winning against the Czech Republic 1–0, with forward Raheem Sterling scoring both goals. In the round of 16, England defeated Germany 2–0 at Wembley Stadium with two late goals from Sterling and Kane, their first knockout phase win at the European Championships (as they defeated Spain on penalties in UEFA Euro 1996). This was also their first win over Germany in a knockout match since the 1966 FIFA World Cup Final. 

In the quarter-final tie, Southgate's England team beat Ukraine 4–0 at the Stadio Olimpico in Rome to reach the semi-finals of a major competition for the fifth time. In the semi-final, England beat Denmark 2–1 at Wembley Stadium and reached the final of the European Championships for the first time. It was only the second time that England had reached any major tournament's final. In the final at Wembley Stadium, an early goal from defender Luke Shaw saw England lead 1–0, before Italy's Leonardo Bonucci levelled the match in the 67th minute. With the scores unchanged after extra time, England ultimately lost the match 3–2 on penalties.

Build up to 2022 World Cup 
In November 2021, Southgate led England to World Cup qualification following a 10–0 win over San Marino. A week later he signed a new contract which meant he would remain the England manager until December 2024. In June 2022, Southgate led England into the UEFA Nations League. England failed to win any of their first four games in the competition, which included a 4–0 defeat to Hungary on 14 June 2022. This was the country's worst home defeat since 1928. On 23 September 2022, following a 1–0 defeat to Italy, England were relegated to League B.

2022 World Cup 
England won their group at the 2022 FIFA World Cup, with wins against both Iran and Wales, and a goalless draw with the United States. In the round of 16, England beat Senegal 3–0, advancing to the quarter-finals, where they lost 2–1 to France. In the immediate aftermath of this defeat, Southgate expressed doubts about continuing as England manager. However, on 18 December 2022, the FA confirmed Southgate would remain in post until after the UEFA Euro 2024.

Other roles
In 2003, Southgate and his close friend Andy Woodman co-wrote Woody & Nord: A Football Friendship. This book describes an enduring friendship forged in the Crystal Palace youth team that has survived Southgate and Woodman's wildly differing fortunes in the professional game. The book won the Sports Book of the Year award for 2004 from the National Sporting Club (now the British Sports Book Awards). He wrote a further book, Anything Is Possible: Be Brave, Be Kind & Follow Your Dreams, published in November 2020.

Southgate was also a co-commentator for ITV at the 2006 World Cup, covering group games alongside Clive Tyldesley. Due to commitments of managing Middlesbrough, he attended for only the first two weeks of the four-week tournament. He resumed a role as pundit and co-commentator after he finished his tenure at Middlesbrough in 2010, working on FA Cup and UEFA Champions League matches for ITV as well as acting as a pundit on England games.

In January 2011, Southgate was appointed as the FA's head of elite development, to work with Trevor Brooking. He left the post in July 2012, and ruled himself out of consideration for the role of technical director, for which he had been a leading candidate.

He is an Ambassador for The Prince's Trust.

Personal life
Southgate married Alison Bird in July 1997 at St Nicholas's Church in Worth; the couple have two children. Southgate and his family have resided in the spa town of Harrogate, North Yorkshire since the early 2000s, owning many homes in and around the town, including a grand Victorian townhouse on the Duchy Estate, before settling in a £3.75 million country house 8 miles from the town centre.

Southgate was appointed an Officer of the Order of the British Empire (OBE) in the 2019 New Year Honours for services to football. In April 2020, during the COVID-19 pandemic, he agreed to take a 30% salary cut.

In popular culture
Beginning with the 2018 World Cup, England supporters adapted the chorus of the 2001 hit single "Whole Again" by English pop girl group Atomic Kitten as a chant for Southgate. The song had previously been adapted by Celtic fans earlier in the 2017–18 season in honour of defender Mikael Lustig.

Looking back on when we first met
I cannot escape and I cannot forget
Southgate, you're the one – you still turn me on
"Football's coming home again"

During the World Cup before England's quarterfinal against Sweden, Atomic Kitten member Natasha Hamilton shared a video of herself on Twitter singing the alternate lyrics. On 3 July 2021, Hamilton and fellow member Liz McClarnon then returned to perform the song with reworked lyrics including the existing alternate ones before chanting England fans at a watch party at Boxpark Croydon for the Euro 2020 quarterfinal against Ukraine. On 6 July 2021, the day before England's semi-final against Denmark, the group released an official full-length version of the adapted song called "Southgate You're The One (Football's Coming Home Again)" via Columbia Records UK. Member Jenny Frost rejoined the band for the first time since 2008 for the remix/re-recording.

Career statistics

Club

International

Scores and results list England's goal tally first, score column indicates score after each Southgate goal

Managerial statistics

Honours

Player
Crystal Palace
Football League First Division: 1993–94

Aston Villa
Football League Cup: 1995–96

Middlesbrough
Football League Cup: 2003–04
UEFA Cup runner-up: 2005–06

Individual
Premier League Player of the Month: January 2000

Manager
England U21
Toulon Tournament: 2016

England
UEFA European Championship runner-up: 2020
UEFA Nations League third place: 2018–19

Individual
Premier League Manager of the Month: August 2008
BBC Sports Personality of the Year Coach Award: 2018 and 2021
FWA Tribute Award: 2019

Orders
 Officer of the Order of the British Empire: 2019

References

External links

Gareth Southgate profile at the Football Association website

Profile on englandfootballonline

1970 births
1998 FIFA World Cup players
2002 FIFA World Cup players
2018 FIFA World Cup managers
Alumni of Croydon College
People educated at Hazelwick School
Association football defenders
Association football midfielders
Aston Villa F.C. players
Crystal Palace F.C. players
England international footballers
England national football team managers
England national under-21 football team managers
English footballers
English Football League managers
English Football League players
English football managers
Footballers from Hertfordshire
Living people
Middlesbrough F.C. managers
Middlesbrough F.C. players
Officers of the Order of the British Empire
Sportspeople from Crawley
Premier League managers
Premier League players
Sportspeople from Watford
UEFA Euro 1996 players
UEFA Euro 2000 players
UEFA Euro 2020 managers
FA Cup Final players
2022 FIFA World Cup managers